Sarah Hudek (born January 20, 1997) is a left-handed pitcher and former outfielder for the Louisiana Ragin' Cajuns softball team and member of the United States women's national baseball team which won a gold medal at the 2015 Pan American Games. Her father, John Hudek was a former Major League Baseball Pitcher.

Playing career
Hudek played on the varsity baseball team at George Ranch High School in Houston, Texas.
She has accepted a scholarship to pitch at Bossier Parish Community College.  She became the first woman ever to pitch for the program.

USA Baseball
As a 17-year-old, she made her debut for Team USA at the 2014 Women's Baseball World Cup, earning a silver medal. She earned a 1-1 record, along with a 0.53 ERA in 17 innings. At the plate, she went 8 for 18 for a .444 batting average, which included a triple and an RBI.

Awards and honors
 2014 USA Baseball Sportswoman of the Year Award

References

1997 births
Living people
American female baseball players
Baseball players from Texas
Baseball players at the 2015 Pan American Games
Pan American Games gold medalists for the United States
Pan American Games medalists in baseball
Medalists at the 2015 Pan American Games
21st-century American women